Ferdinand J. "Fred" Zbikowski (November 18, 1912 - January 28, 1985), sometimes known as Fred Shields, was a U.S. soccer player who was a member of the U.S. soccer team at the 1936 Summer Olympics. He played professionally in the American Soccer League and is a member of the National Soccer Hall of Fame.

Zbikowski was born in Harrison, New Jersey, where he played soccer at Harrison High School.   He then attended Panzer College.  He played for the Newark Portuguese in the State League, Independent F.C. in the Northern New Jersey League, Prague Football Club and the Kearny Scots-Americans of the American Soccer League.  He was a member of the U.S. soccer team at the 1936 Summer Olympics. He served with the Third Army during World War II. Shields was a physical education instructor at Harrison High School for 40 years; his wife also taught at the school, and his son Ron was HHS principal for 19 years. He served as a high school, college and senior amateur referee from 1946-1973.  He was also a referee of some 1948 National Challenge Cup games. At some point, he changed his name to Fred Shields.  He was inducted into the National Soccer Hall of Fame in 1968 under that name.

References

External links
National Soccer Hall of Fame profile

1912 births
1985 deaths
American soccer players
Soccer players from New Jersey
Olympic soccer players of the United States
Footballers at the 1936 Summer Olympics
American Soccer League (1933–1983) players
Kearny Scots-Americans players
National Soccer Hall of Fame members
American soccer referees
Newark Portuguese players
People from Harrison, New Jersey
Sportspeople from Hudson County, New Jersey
Association footballers not categorized by position
Panzer College alumni